Hadia may refer to :
 Handia (drink), a rice beer popular in Northern India
 Hadia Tajik, a Pakistani-Norwegian jurist, journalist and politician.